The Ethiopia Davis Cup team represents Ethiopia in Davis Cup tennis competition and are governed by the Ethiopian Tennis Federation.  They have not competed since 2002.

History
Ethiopia competed in its first Davis Cup in 1995.  Their best result was fourth in their Group III pool in 1996.

Current team (2022) 

 Yabets Kebede
 Abdella Nedim Mohammed
 Teame Gebresilase
 Zekarias Tegenu
 Natnael Ahmed

See also
Davis Cup
Ethiopia Fed Cup team

External links

Davis Cup teams
Davis Cup
Davis Cup